Dąbrówka Królewska  is a village in the administrative district of Gmina Gruta, within Grudziądz County, Kuyavian-Pomeranian Voivodeship, in north-central Poland. It is located in the Chełmno Land in the historic region of Pomerania.

The village has a population of 700.

History

During the German occupation (World War II), Dąbrówka Królewska was one of the sites of executions of Poles carried out by the Germans in 1939 as part of the Intelligenzaktion. Farmers from Dąbrówka Królewska were also murdered by the German SS and Selbstschutz in the large massacre of Poles committed in 1939 in nearby Białochowo, also as part of the Intelligenzaktion.

References

Villages in Grudziądz County